The Gallo-Romance branch of the Romance languages includes in the narrowest sense the langues d'oïl and Franco-Provençal. However, other definitions are far broader and variously encompass the Occitan or Occitano-Romance, Gallo-Italic or Rhaeto-Romance languages.

Old Gallo-Romance was one of the two languages in which the Oaths of Strasbourg were written in 842 AD.

Classification 

The Gallo-Romance group includes:
 The langues d'oïl include French, Orleanais, Gallo, Angevin, Tourangeau, Saintongeais, Poitevin, Bourguignon, Picard, Walloon, Lorrain and Norman.
 Franco-Provençal in east-central France, western Switzerland and the Aosta Valley region of northwestern Italy. Formerly thought of as a dialect of either the langue d'oïl or Occitan, it is linguistically a language on its own or rather a separate group of languages, as many of its dialects have little mutual intelligibility. It shares features with both French and Occitan.

Other language families often included in Gallo-Romance:

 Occitano-Romance, including languages and dialects such as Catalan, Occitan, Provençal, Gascon-Aranese and Aragonese.
 Rhaeto-Romance, including Romansh of Switzerland, Ladin of the Dolomites area and Friulian of Friuli. Rhaeto-Romance can be classified as either Gallo-Romance or a separate branch within the Western Romance languages. Rhaeto-Romance is a diverse group, with the Italian varieties influenced by Venetian and Italian and Romansh by Franco-Provençal.
 Gallo-Italic, including Piedmontese, Ligurian, Western and Eastern Lombard, Emilian, Romagnol, Gallo-Italic of Sicily and Gallo-Italic of Basilicata. Venetian is also part of the Gallo-Italic branch according both to Ethnologue and Glottolog. Gallo-Italic can be classified as either Gallo-Romance or a separate branch of the Western Romance languages. Ligurian and Venetian, if it is considered in the category, retain the final -o and are the exceptions in Gallo-Romance.
 In addition, there are several French-based creole languages such as Haitian Creole.

In the view of some linguists (Pierre Bec, Andreas Schorta, Heinrich Schmid, Geoffrey Hull), Rhaeto-Romance and Gallo-Italic form a single linguistic unity named "Rhaeto-Cisalpine" or "Padanian", which includes also the Venetian and Istriot languages, whose Italianate features are deemed to be superficial and secondary in nature.

Traditional geographical extension 

How far the Gallo-Romance languages spread varies a great deal depending on which languages are included in the group. Those included in its narrowest definition (the langues d'oïl and Arpitan) were historically spoken in the northern half of France, including parts of Flanders, Alsace and part of Lorraine; the Wallonia region of Belgium; the Channel Islands; parts of Switzerland; and Northern Italy.

Today, a single Gallo-Romance language (French) dominates much of the geographic region (including the formerly-non-Romance areas of France) and has also spread overseas.

At its broadest, the area also encompasses Southern France; Catalonia, the Valencian Community, and the Balearic islands in eastern Spain; Andorra; and much of Northern Italy.

General characteristics 

The Gallo-Romance languages are generally considered the most innovative (least conservative) among the Romance languages. Northern France, the medieval area of the langue d'oïl from which modern French developed, was the epicentre. Characteristic Gallo-Romance features generally developed the earliest, appear in their most extreme manifestation in the langue d'oïl and gradually spread out from there along riverways and roads. The earliest vernacular Romance writing occurred in Northern France, as the development of vernacular writing in a given area was forced by the almost total inability of Romance speakers to understand Classical Latin, which was still the vehicle of writing and culture.

However, when the loss of a final vowel would result in an impossible final cluster (e.g. ), an epenthetic vowel appears in place of the lost vowel, usually . Generally, the same changes also occurred in final syllables closed by a consonant. Franco-Provençal, however, generally preserves the original final vowel after a syllable-final cluster, such as quattuor "four" > quatro (compare French quatre).

Elsewhere, final vowel loss occurred later, or unprotected  was lost earlier (perhaps under Italian influence).

Other than southern Occitano-Romance, the Gallo-Romance languages are quite innovative, with French and some of the Gallo-Italian languages rivalling each other for the most extreme phonological changes compared with more conservative languages. For example, French sain, saint, sein, ceint, seing meaning "healthy, holy, breast, (he) girds, signature" (Latin sānum, sanctum, sinum, cingit, signum) are all pronounced .

In other ways, however, the Gallo-Romance languages are conservative. The older stages of many of the languages are famous for preserving a two-case system, consisting of nominative and oblique cases, which was fully marked on nouns, adjectives and determiners; was inherited almost directly from the Latin nominative and accusative cases; and preserved a number of different declensional classes and irregular forms.

In the opposite of the normal pattern, the languages closest to the oïl epicentre preserve the case system the best, and languages at the periphery (near languages that had long before lost the case system except for pronouns) lost it early. For example, the case system was preserved in Old Occitan until around the 13th century but had already been lost in Old Catalan although there were very few other differences between them.

The following tables show two examples of the extensive phonological changes that French has undergone. (Compare modern Italian saputo, vita, which are even more conservative than the reconstructed Western Romance forms.)

These are the notable characteristics of the Gallo-Romance languages:
 Further reductions of final vowels in langue d'oïl and many Gallo-Italic languages, with the feminine  and epenthetic vowel  merging into , which was often subsequently dropped.
 Early heavy reduction of unstressed vowels in the interior of a word, which is another defining characteristic. It and final vowel reduction are most of the extreme phonemic differences between the Northern and the Central Italian dialects, which otherwise share a great deal of vocabulary and syntax.
 Loss of the final vowels phonemicised the long vowels, which had been automatic concomitants of stressed open syllables. The phonemic long vowels are maintained directly in many Northern Italian dialects. Elsewhere, phonemic length was lost, but many of the long vowels had been diphthongised, which resulted in the maintenance of the original distinction. The langue d'oïl branch was again at the forefront of innovation, with at least five of the seven long vowels diphthongising (only high vowels were spared).
 Extreme and repeated lenition occurs in many languages, especially in langue d'oïl and many Gallo-Italian languages. Examples from French: ˈvītam > vie  "life"; *saˈpūtum > su  "known"; similarly vu  "seen" < *vidūtum, pu  "been able" < *potūtum, eu  "had" < *habūtum. Examples from Lombard:  *"căsa" > "cà"  "home, house"
 Other than Occitano-Romance languages, most Gallo-Romance languages are subject-obligatory, but all other Romance languages are pro-drop languages. That is a late development triggered by progressive phonetic erosion. Old French was still a null-subject language until the loss of secondary final consonants in Middle French caused verb forms (e.g. aime/aimes/aiment; viens/vient) to be pronounced the same.

Gallo-Italian languages have a number of features in common with the other Italian languages:
The palatalisation in the masculine amici , compared with the lack of palatalisation in amiche , shows that feminine -e cannot come from Latin -ae, which became  by the 1st century AD and would certainly have triggered palatalisation.
 Use of nominative -i for the masculine plural, instead of the accusative -os.

References

Further reading
 Buckley, Eugene (2009). "Phonetics and phonology in Gallo-Romance palatalisation". In: Transactions of the Philological Society, 107, pp. 31-65.
 Jensen, Frede. Old French and Comparative Gallo-Romance Syntax. Berlin, New York: Max Niemeyer Verlag, 2012 [1990]. https://doi.org/10.1515/9783110938166
 Klingebiel, Kathryn. "A Century of Research in Franco-Provençal and Poitevin: Eastern Vs. Western Gallo-Romance". In: Historiographia Linguistica, Volume 12, Issue 3, Jan 1985, pp. 389-407. . DOI: https://doi.org/10.1075/hl.12.3.05kli
 Oliviéri, Michèle, and Patrick Sauzet. "Southern Gallo-Romance (Occitan)". In: The Oxford Guide to the Romance Languages. Edited by Adam Ledgeway, and Martin Maiden. Oxford: Oxford University Press, 2016. Oxford Scholarship Online, 2016. . doi: 10.1093/acprof:oso/9780199677108.003.0019.
 Smith, John Charles. "French and northern Gallo-Romance". In: The Oxford Guide to the Romance Languages. Edited by Adam Ledgeway, and Martin Maiden. Oxford: Oxford University Press, 2016. Oxford Scholarship Online, 2016. . doi: 10.1093/acprof:oso/9780199677108.003.0018.